Berchem railway station is a railway station serving Berchem, in the commune of Roeser, in southern Luxembourg.  It is operated by Chemins de Fer Luxembourgeois, the state-owned railway company.

The station is situated on Line 60, which connects Luxembourg City to the Red Lands of the south of the country.

External links
 Rail.lu page on Berchem station

Roeser
Railway stations in Luxembourg
Railway stations on CFL Line 60